St Chad's Church is on Chester Road (the A41) in the civil parish of Tushingham-cum-Grindley, Macefen and Bradley, Cheshire, England.  It is an active Anglican parish church in the deanery of Malpas, the archdeaconry of Chester, and the diocese of Chester.  Its benefice is combined with those of St Michael, Marbury, and St Mary, Whitewell.  The church is recorded in the National Heritage List for England as a designated Grade II listed building.

History

St Chad's was built between 1860 and 1863 to a design by Robert Jennings of Atherstone, and the tower was added in 1897 by Hodgson Fowler.

Architecture

The church is constructed in red sandstone with grey slate roofs.  Its plan is cruciform, and consists of a three-bay nave with a south porch, single-bay transepts, a two-bay chancel, a sacristy in the corner of the chancel and the north transept, and a west tower.  The tower has three stages in Perpendicular style, with an octagonal northwest stair turret, and a crenelated parapet. In the bottom stage is a three-light west window and a statue of Saint Chad in a niche, single-light trefoil-headed windows on the north and south sides of the middle stage, and two-light bell openings in the top stage.  The body of the church is in Early English style with lancet windows.

The interior of the church is plastered, with dressings in stone.  The west tower acts as a baptistry and contains an octagonal font.  The stained glass in the west window (dated 1897) and in the north transept (dated 1904) is by Kempe.  There is a ring of six bells, all cast by John Taylor & Co in 1897.

See also

Listed buildings in Tushingham cum Grindley

References

Church of England church buildings in Cheshire
Grade II listed churches in Cheshire
Churches completed in 1897
Diocese of Chester
Cheshire West and Chester